Smilavičy is a city in Belarus in the Chervyen District of Minsk Region, located at  at 156 m altitude.

In Jewish tradition it is known as Smilovitz, and was a shtetl in the Russian Empire.
The village is the birthplace of the renowned painter Chaïm Soutine.

References

External links 

Urban-type settlements in Belarus
Smilavicy
Chervyen District
Minsk Voivodeship
Igumensky Uyezd